Milton Castro may refer to:
 Milton de Castro, Brazilian sprinter
 Milton Castro (taekwondo)